Joálisson Santos Oliveira (born 31 March 1991), commonly known as Jô Santos, is a Brazilian professional footballer who last played as a forward for Ekstraklasa side Radomiak Radom.

Club career

Sheriff Tiraspol
On 13 January 2016, Jô Santos signed for Sheriff Tiraspol. He left Sheriff Tiraspol when his contract expired on 31 December 2018.

Politehnica Iași
On 2 August 2017, Jô Santos moved to Romanian club Politehnica Iași, and signed a one-year contract with the moldavian team. Later that month, he made his Liga I debut against Dinamo București, and scored a goal to earn Politehnica Iași a 2–1 victory. Santos returned to Sheriff Tiraspol after his loan deal on 3 July 2018.

Ventspils
On 25 January 2019, Ventspils announced the signing of Santos.

Hermannstadt
On 12 July 2019, Jô Santos returned to the Romanian Liga I and signed with Hermannstadt.

Honours

Club
Sheriff Tiraspol
Divizia Națională (3): 2015–16, 2016–17
Moldovan Cup (1): 2016–17
Moldovan Supercup (1): 2016

References

External links

1991 births
Living people
Brazilian footballers
Association football midfielders
Moldovan Super Liga players
Liga I players
Ekstraklasa players
C.D. Tondela players
S.C. Freamunde players
FC Zimbru Chișinău players
FC Sheriff Tiraspol players
FC Politehnica Iași (2010) players
FK Ventspils players
FC Hermannstadt players
FC Viitorul Constanța players
Radomiak Radom players
Brazilian expatriate footballers
Expatriate footballers in Moldova
Brazilian expatriate sportspeople in Moldova
Expatriate footballers in Romania
Brazilian expatriate sportspeople in Romania
Expatriate footballers in Qatar
Brazilian expatriate sportspeople in Qatar
Expatriate footballers in Poland
Brazilian expatriate sportspeople in Poland